The 2020–21 season is Hibernian's (Hibs) fourth season of play back in the top league of Scottish football (the Scottish Premiership), having been promoted from the Scottish Championship at the end of the 2016–17 season. Hibs lost in the semi-finals of the League Cup to St Johnstone, and in the 2021 Scottish Cup Final to the same opponents. Hibs finished third in the Premiership, which was their highest league position since 2004–05.

Results and fixtures

Friendlies
Due to government rules introduced during the coronavirus pandemic, Hibs were restricted in their pre-season activities. Contact training was only permitted from Monday 29 June, and Hibs played only against other Premiership clubs during pre-season. One of those training matches had to be called off due to a delay in obtaining coronavirus test results.

Scottish Premiership

Hibs won their first three games of the season, the first time they had done this in the top division of the Scottish football league system since 1974–75. A 1–0 win at Aberdeen in the penultimate match clinched third place for Hibs, which was their highest finishing position since 2004–05. The win at Aberdeen was their 11th away from home in the league, which set a new club record for a season in the top division.

League Cup

Hibs were drawn into Group B of the League Cup group stage, along with Dundee, Forfar Athletic, Brora Rangers and Cove Rangers. Hibs and Dundee both progressed to the last 16, where they were drawn against each other again. A 1–0 win in the rematch put Hibs into the quarter-finals, where they were drawn away to Championship side Alloa Athletic. Hibs came from behind to win 2–1 at Alloa, and were then paired with St Johnstone in the semi-finals. Hibs lost that match 3–0, thereby losing an opportunity to win a competition in which they had become favourites as the Old Firm clubs had been knocked out in earlier rounds. Manager Jack Ross said he was "angry" at the way the team had fallen out of the game in the second half.

Matches

Scottish Cup

Hibs entered the 2020–21 competition at the third round stage (last 32), and were drawn away to Championship club Queen of the South. The tie was delayed until April because the lower divisions of the SPFL were suspended for much of the winter due to the COVID-19 pandemic. Hibs progressed to the fourth round, where they were given another away tie against League Two club Stranraer. Due to the condensed schedule the draws for the fourth round and quarter-finals were made at the same time; a 4–0 win at Stranraer gave Hibs a home tie with Motherwell. Hibs lost a two-goal lead late in normal time against Motherwell, but progressed to the semi-finals by winning a penalty shootout. Hibs beat Dundee United 2–0 in the semi-final, their first victory at that stage of a cup competition (after five successive defeats) since 2016. In the final Hibs lost 1–0 to St Johnstone, which meant that the Perth club won a cup double.

Matches

Player statistics
Note: Statistics for the delayed 2019–20 Scottish Cup semi-final played on 31 October 2020 are recorded under the 2019–20 Hibernian F.C. season article.

|-
! colspan=11 style=background:#dcdcdc; text-align:center| Goalkeepers
|-

|-
! colspan=11 style=background:#dcdcdc; text-align:center| Defenders
|-

|-
! colspan=11 style=background:#dcdcdc; text-align:center| Midfielders
|-

|-
! colspan=11 style=background:#dcdcdc; text-align:center| Forwards
|-

Club statistics

League table

Division summary

League Cup table

Management statistics

Transfers
During the 2020–21 season, Hibs formed strategic partnerships with Charleston Battery, Stenhousemuir and Brighton & Hove Albion.

Players in

Players out

Loans in

Loans out

See also
List of Hibernian F.C. seasons

Notes

References

2020-21
Scottish football clubs 2020–21 season